Gleiberg may refer to:

 The Gleiberg volcano, in Hesse, Germany
 Krofdorf-Gleiberg, a settlement in Hesse, Germany
 Gerberga of Gleiberg (970 - 1036?), a German noblewoman